Bryan Browning (1773–1856) was an English architect working in Stamford.

Life 

Bryan Browning was born at Thurlby in Lincolnshire in 1773. Nothing is known about his architectural training but in 1817 he made designs for the re-building of Ringwood vicarage in Hampshire. Between about 1820 and 1830 he worked in partnership with George Woolcott in Doughty Street as Builders and Surveyors. In this period Browning and Woolcott worked as contractors for a number of major building projects in London. This included the building of Lancaster House. They also built Strensham Court in Worcestershire, probably to designs by George Maddox. In 1821 Bryan Browning  designed the Sessions House at Bourne, in Lincolnshire and in 1824 he was the architect for the House of Correction at Folkingham. By 1834 he had  returned to Lincolnshire and was living at Northorpe near Bourne.  He had moved to Stamford by 1838 where  he was retained by the Marquess of Exeter and was being  paid £180. In 1847, his son, Edward Browning,  who had trained under George Maddox, joined the practice.  The practice worked from Broad Street, Stamford.  Bryan Browning died on 1 October 1856 and is buried in the cemetery there.

Works

Public buildings 

1821. Town Hall, Bourne, Lincolnshire
1824-5. House of Correction at Folkingham
1835. Stamford Workhouse
1842. Stamford Institution (Camera Obscura House)

School 
1840-1 National School, Titchmarsh, Northamptonshire

Houses 
1843. Barn Hill House, Stamford. Remodelled for Lord Exeter.
1846-48. Alterations to Apethorpe, Northants.

Rectories and vicarages 
1833. Alwalton, Northamptonshire.
1835 Fletton, Hunts.
1838 Greatford, Lincolnshire.
1839 Deeping St James, Lincolnshire.
1840 Stoke Dry Rectory, Rutland

Miscellaneous 

1845. Grant's Iron Foundry, Wharf Road, Stamford. Built for Lord Exeter. Only the monumental arch now survives. This was built in 1845 as the entrance to Grant's iron foundry and was designed by Bryan Browning. The site became Blashfield's Terracotta Works in 1858.   In 1937 the Stamford architect John Charles Traylen rebuilt the arch several feet to the south and parallel with the road.

References

Literature 
Antram N (revised), Pevsner, N. & Harris J, (1989), The Buildings of England: Lincolnshire, Yale University Press.
Antonia Brodie (ed), Directory of British Architects, 1834–1914: 2 Vols,  British Architectural Library, Royal Institute of British Architects, 2001, Vol 1, pg. 280.
Colvin H. A (1995), Biographical Dictionary of British Architects 1600–1840. Yale University Press, 3rd edition London, pg.172.

19th-century English architects
English ecclesiastical architects
Architects from Lincolnshire
1816 births
1881 deaths
People from South Kesteven District